Rinaldo degli Albizzi (1370–1442) was an Italian nobleman, a member of the Florentine family of the Albizzi. Along with Palla Strozzi, he was the primary opponent of Cosimo de' Medici's rise in Florence.

Albizzi entered public service for the Republic of Florence in 1399 as a diplomat under the oligarchic rule of his father, Maso degli Albizzi. His brother, Luca di Maso degli Albizzi, married Aurelia de Medici, daughter of Nicola de Medici (b.1384), son of Vieri de Medici and Bice Strozzi. He served on several dozen official diplomatic missions, first locally in towns such as Arezzo and Cortona, later on more distant assignments to Pisa, Lucca, Naples, and Rome.  At the height of his diplomatic career, he was the principal ambassador for Florence, and was particularly active in ecclesiastic affairs.

On his father's death in 1417, Albizzi became the unofficial second-in-command of the oligarchy under his father's longtime friend, Niccolo da Uzzano. He eventually assumed leadership when Uzzano died in 1431.

After Volterra revolted against Florence in 1428, Rinaldo degli Albizzi was sent to "reacquire" the city from the rebels led by Giovanni di Contugi and his fellow magistrates. Afterward, Rinaldo incited Niccolò Fortebraccio to "attack the Lucchese under cover of some fictitious quarrel,"  an action that led Florence to attempt the conquest of Lucca. During this campaign, Albizzi served as War Commissioner under the Ten of War. However, after he was accused of trying to enrich himself by sacking conquered territory, he was removed from his position and recalled to Florence.

Later, in 1433, Albizzi convinced several prominent nobles to strike out against Cosimo de' Medici, who he feared was becoming too powerful. Eventually, Albizzi helped Bernardo Guadagni, a candidate for a position among the Signori, to pay off his debts, which had disqualified him from seeking office. Guadagni then won the position of Gonfaloniere of Justice. Through Guadagni, Albizzi summoned Cosimo to the palace, where he was captured. After a short trial, Cosimo was sentenced to 20 years' exile from Florence, although Albizzi sought the death penalty.

However, with the downturn of Florentine fortunes during the war with Milan, Cosimo returned with popular acclamation barely a year later, and Rinaldo degli Albizzi was in his turn exiled. Although he tried several times to convince the Duke of Milan, Filippo Maria Visconti, to intervene and restore him to power in Florence, his hopes ended in 1440 with the Florentine victory at the Battle of Anghiari.

Albizzi died at Ancona in 1442 after a trip to Jerusalem.

Issue 
Rinaldo married in 1392 Alessandra de' Ricco. They had twelve children, eight sons and four daughters:
 Ormanno (1398 - after 1457), ambassador and military
 Maso (1400-1467), city ​​governor
 Francesco (1402-1463), monk
 Tobia (1403-?), religious
 Silvestro (1407-?), monk
 Giovanni (1412-1433)
 Margherita, she married Gherardo Gambacorti
 Felice, monk
 Susanna, she married Bartolomeo Nelli
 Dragotto
 Nicoletta, she married Giovanni degli Agli
 Selvaggia, she married Francesco Mancini

Fictional Depictions

In Roberto Rossellini's three-part miniseries The Age of the Medici (1973), Rinaldo degli Albizzi was portrayed by Hungarian actor Tom Felleghy.

In Frank Spotnitz's eight-part television series Medici: Masters of Florence (2016), Albizzi was portrayed by English actor Lex Shrapnel. In this series, however, Albizzi is represented as approximately the same age as Cosimo de' Medici, whereas in reality he was 19 years older than Cosimo. He is also depicted as being murdered along with his son immediately upon their leaving Florence for Albizzi's exile, supposedly on Cosimo's orders.

Footnotes

1370 births
1442 deaths
Italian untitled nobility
Nobility from Florence
14th-century people of the Republic of Florence
15th-century people of the Republic of Florence
Rinaldo